Sheshadri is an Indian name. Seshadri refers to Sesha, the dasa of Lord Vishnu, in the Vaishnavite tradition of Hinduism. Seshadri refers to Sesha, the Snake and Adri the mountain; also name of one of the seven mountains in Tirupati while we cross and reach the main mountain.

People
 Haricharan Seshadri (born 1987), Indian singer
 C. S. Seshadri (1932–2020), Indian mathematician.
 Janamanchi Seshadri Sarma (1882–1950), Telugu poet
 Sir K. Seshadri Iyer (1845–1901), advocate who served as the Dewan of Mysore
 Kartik Seshadri (born 1957), sitarist, composer and teacher
 Meenakshi Seshadri (born 1963), Indian film actress
 P. Sheshadri (born 1963), Kannada filmmaker and director
 Shekhar Sheshadri, Indian psychiatrist, brother of Meenakshi Seshadri
 Seshadri Srinivasa Ayyangar, Indian lawyer, politician and freedom-fighter
 Seshadri Swamigal (1870–1929), Indian saint
 Vijay Seshadri (born 1954), Brooklyn-based poet, essayist and literary critic
 Nambirajan Seshadri (born 1962), Indian-American Preeminent Wireless Communications Researcher, Bell Labs and Broadcom Corporation

Other uses
 Padma Seshadri Bala Bhavan, group of schools located in Chennai and now in Bangalore
 Seshadri is one of the seven hills of the Tirumala Venkateswara Temple
 Seshadri constant, in algebraic geometry is an invariant of an ample line bundle L at a point P on an algebraic variety
 Seshadripuram, is a residential locality in the central part of the city of Bengaluru